Miranda Es Imposible!, also known as Es Imposible! is the fourth studio album by the Argentine band Miranda!, released on August 24, 2009, by Pelo Music.

Critical reception 

In a review from AllMusic, Mariano Prunes wrote that "not surprisingly", everything in Es Imposible! sounds "big, polished, and ready to take over the airwaves of an entire continent", "but sadly, much is lost in the process". He praised the band's "vocal and songwriting talent", "catchy melodies" and "marvelously spiraling choruses", but also said that "they may achieve stardom at the cost of their fun and originality, is sad indeed".

A Clarín contributor described Es Imposible! as an album "more rock and organic than the rest", "with more serious sounds and less gossip than any of its predecessors" like El Disco de Tu Corazón. He praised Sergi's "vocal experimentation" and the self-confidence and freshness in the search for a dark album, comparing it to the contemporary Twilight saga.

Accolades

Track listing 
All songs written by Alejandro Sergi and produced by Cachorro López.

Credits and personnel 
Credits adapted from the liner notes of Miranda Es Imposible!.

 Alejandro Sergi – lead vocals, composition, programming, guitar
 Juliana Gatttas – lead vocals
 Leandro Fuentes – guitar
 Nicolás Grimaldi – bass
 Cachorro López – production
 Daniel Avila – drums, percussion
 Sebastián Schon – keyboards, acoustic guitar
 Gabriel Lucena – keyboards
 Ezequiel Deró – keyboards
 Nicolás Guerieri – keyboards
 Demian Nava – programming
 Capri – programming

Charts

References 

2009 albums
Spanish-language albums
Miranda! albums
Albums produced by Cachorro López